Ashley Elizabeth Marie Lawrence (born June 11, 1995) is a Canadian professional soccer player who plays as a full-back or a midfielder for Division 1 Féminine club Paris Saint-Germain and the Canadian national team.

College career
Lawrence played college soccer at West Virginia University for the Mountaineers, where she co-captained the team, and won numerous accolades.

Club career

Early career
In June 2016, Lawrence signed with Vaughan Azzurri of League1 Ontario to get some game action prior to the 2016 Rio Olympics. She also played for Ottawa Fury in 2014.

Paris Saint-Germain
Upon graduating from West Virginia University, Lawrence was a highly rated prospect prior to the 2017 NWSL College Draft. In January 2017, Lawrence signed with Paris Saint-Germain in Division 1 Féminine, with a contract that lasts until 2019. In December 2018, Lawrence would sign a multi-year contract extension with PSG.

International career
Lawrence made her debut for Canada against China PR during the 2013 Yongchuan Cup. In August 2016, she won the bronze medal in the 2016 Summer Olympics.

On August 2, 2021, she played her 100th match for Canada in the semi-finals of the 2020 Summer Olympics.  At 116:56 of the Olympic final, she cleared away a Swedish cross on her own goal line to prevent a header goal. Canada went on to win the match in the penalty shoot-out.

Personal life
Her mother Tina is originally from Yarmouth, Nova Scotia while her father is from Jamaica.

Career statistics

Club

International

International goals 
Scores and results list Canada's goal tally first.

Honours
Paris Saint-Germain

 Division 1 Féminine: 2020–21
 Coupe de France: 2017–18, 2021–22
 UEFA Women's Champions League runner-up: 2016–17
Canada
 Summer Olympics: 2021; bronze medal, 2016
 Algarve Cup: 2016; runner up: 2017
 Four Nations Tournament: 2015
Individual
 IFFHS Women's World Team: 2021
IFFHS Women's CONCACAF Team of the Year: 2021
CONCACAF Women's Olympic Qualifying Championship Best XI: 2016
 Canadian Women's Player of the Year: 2019
Canadian U-17 Player of the Year: 2011, 2012

References

External links
 
 

1995 births
Canada women's international soccer players
Women's association football fullbacks
Canadian women's soccer players
USL W-League (1995–2015) players
Living people
Black Canadian women's soccer players
Expatriate women's footballers in France
Soccer players from Toronto
West Virginia Mountaineers women's soccer players
2015 FIFA Women's World Cup players
Women's association football midfielders
Footballers at the 2016 Summer Olympics
Olympic soccer players of Canada
Olympic bronze medalists for Canada
Olympic medalists in football
Medalists at the 2016 Summer Olympics
Canadian sportspeople of Jamaican descent
Division 1 Féminine players
Paris Saint-Germain Féminine players
2019 FIFA Women's World Cup players
Footballers at the 2020 Summer Olympics
FIFA Century Club
Medalists at the 2020 Summer Olympics
Olympic gold medalists for Canada
Vaughan Azzurri (women) players
Toronto Lady Lynx players
Ottawa Fury (women) players